Madonna and Child is a tempera on panel tondo painting by Luca Signorelli, created c. 1492–1493, now in the Alte Pinakothek in Munich. The rocky landscape in the background shows the influence of Leonardo da Vinci, whilst to the right is a nude seated on a rock, referencing the marble Spinario, which at that date was already in the Uffizi in Florence.

References

Paintings of the Madonna and Child by Luca Signorelli
Collection of the Alte Pinakothek
1490s paintings